Lance Hammer is an American independent filmmaker.

His first film, Ballast, premiered in competition at the Sundance Film Festival where he won the US Dramatic Directing Award. Ballast was nominated for six Independent Spirit Awards and four Gotham Independent Film Awards. Hammer won the Gotham Independent Film Award for Breakthrough Director.

Filmography
Batman Forever (1995; computer graphics city designer)
Batman & Robin (1997; digital design associate)
Practical Magic (1998; visual effects art director)
The Man Who Wasn't There (2001; assistant art director)
Issaquena (2002; director, producer, writer)
Ballast (2008; director, producer, writer, editor)

References

External links

American film directors
Living people
Year of birth missing (living people)